Son Suk-ku (born February 7, 1983), also spelled as Son Seok-koo, is a South Korean actor. He gained recognition for his roles in the television series Matrimonial Chaos (2018), Designated Survivor: 60 Days (2019), D.P. (2021), and My Liberation Notes (2022), as well as the films Nothing Serious (2021) and The Roundup (2022).

Early life
Son was born on February 7, 1983, in Taepyeong-dong, Jung-gu, Daejeon, South Korea. He started studying abroad early in middle school and continued his studies in Canada and the United States. He majored in visual arts and film at the School of Art Institute of Chicago, dreaming of becoming a documentary director.

In 2005, during his mandatory military service, he volunteered to join the Zaytun Division, a Republic of Korea Army contingent which carried out peacekeeping and reconstruction missions in war-torn Iraq.

Career
Son began his acting career, playing a minor role in 2014 film Scarlet Innocence and appeared in Black Stone (2016), Sense8 (2017) and Mother (2018).

His popularity began to rise with his starring role in KBS2 romantic comedy drama Matrimonial Chaos (2018) and his supporting role in tvN political thriller drama Designated Survivor: 60 Days (2019).

In 2021, he played the role of captain Im Ji-seop in Netflix series D.P. The same year, he starred in the romance film Nothing Serious which marked his first big-screen leading role. Son made his directorial debut in Watcha short film Unframed – Rebroadcast.

In 2022, Son starred in the JTBC slice-of-life drama My Liberation Notes. His portrayal of Mr. Gu – a secretive alcoholic stranger, was met with praise by critics and audience and he topped the drama performers popularity ranking for five consecutive weeks. The same year, he starred in the role of the villain – Kang Hae-sung in the crime action film The Roundup which became the highest-grossing film of 2022 in South Korea, attracting 12 million movie-goers. Success of his 2022 projects led to an increased popularity and recognition for Son.

Filmography

Film

Television series

Web series

Music video appearances

Theater

Awards and nominations

References

External links
 Son Suk-ku at SBD Entertainment 
 
 

1983 births
Living people
South Korean male film actors
South Korean male television actors
21st-century South Korean male actors
People from Daejeon